R. Foster Clark was an American football and baseball coach at Louisiana Tech University. Clark has the highest winning percentage of any football and baseball head coach in Louisiana Tech history. Clark's 1921 football season went undefeated and won the Louisiana Intercollegiate Athletic Association (LIAA) title.

Head coaching record

Football

Baseball

References

Year of birth missing
Year of death missing
Louisiana Tech Bulldogs baseball coaches
Louisiana Tech Bulldogs football coaches